The Field is a play written by John B. Keane, first performed in 1965. It tells the story of the hardened Irish farmer "Bull" McCabe and his love for the land he rents. The play debuted at Dublin's Olympia Theatre in 1965, with Ray McAnally as "The Bull" and Eamon Keane as "The Bird" O'Donnell. The play was published in 1966 by Mercier Press. A new version with some changes was produced in 1987.

A film adaptation was released in 1990, directed by Jim Sheridan with Richard Harris in the lead role.

John B. Keane based the story on the 1958 murder of Moss Moore, a bachelor farmer living in Reamore, County Kerry. Dan Foley, a neighbour with whom Moore had a long-running dispute, was suspected of the murder, but the charges were denied by Foley's family.

Plot
The Field is set in a small country village in southwest Ireland.

Rugged individualist Bull McCabe has spent five hard years of labour cultivating a small plot of rented land, nurturing it from barren rock into a fertile field. When the owner of the field decides to auction it, he believes that he has a claim to the land. The McCabes intimidate most of the townspeople out of bidding in the auction, to the chagrin of auctioneer Mick Flanagan, but Galwayman William Dee arrives from England, where he has lived for many years, with a plan to cover the field with concrete and extract gravel from the adjacent river. An encounter between William and the McCabes ends in William's death and a cover-up.

Characters
 Thady "The Bull" McCabe - The play's main character and anti-hero, Bull is as strong as a cow - and just as powerful. Having grazed and rented Maggie Butler's field for five years, along with his son Tadhg, Bull believes he is the rightful owner.
 Tadhg McCabe - Bull's son and faithful companion, who too shares his father's passion of land.
 " The Bird" O'Donnell - A mischievous calf buyer and a regular at Flanagan's pub, Bird is an acquaintance of The McCabes.' Con Man.
 Mick Flanagan - The local publican and auctioneer, Mick is mendacious and sly and is another acquaintance of the McCabes, who attempts to help them secure the field.
 Maimie Flanagan - Mick's younger wife and the mother of his nine children. Maimie is flirtatious and charming and has a bitter, strained relationship with her husband, whilst maintaining a strong relationship with her eldest son Leamy.
 Maggie Butler - An elderly widow, who has rented her late husband's field to The McCabes for the past five years. Maggie is frail and destitute and wishes to put the field up for public auction, much to the McCabes' disgust.
 William Dee - A young Galway man, who has been living in England for twelve years. Considered an "outsider", William decides to bid against the Bull McCabe for Maggie Butler's field.
 Leamy Flanagan - Mick and Maimie's eldest son.
 Dandy McCabe - The Bull McCabe's first cousin, who, unlike Bull, is honest and jovial.
 Mrs. McCabe - Dandy's wife, to whom he has been married to for twenty years.
 Tom Leahy - The local sergeant, investigating the death of a donkey.
 Fr Murphy - The local PP

Film version
Jim Sheridan directed a film version in 1990. Richard Harris received an Academy Award nomination for his portrayal.

Most characters in the film were different from the play but the film only retained The Bull, The Bird and Tadhg. Some events in the play were also changed in the film.

Notes

References
"John B Keane". doolee.com. Retrieved March 17, 2007.
"The Field". mercierpress.i.e. Retrieved January 26, 2009.

1965 plays
Irish plays adapted into films
Plays set in Ireland